Milsons Point ferry wharf is located on the northern side of Sydney Harbour serving the Sydney suburb of Milsons Point. It is next to Luna Park and the Sydney Harbour Bridge. It is served by Sydney Ferries Parramatta River and Pyrmont Bay services operated by First Fleet and RiverCat class ferries.

History
On 24 May 2010, the wharf closed for a six-month rebuild. The existing wharf was demolished, with a new one built. A project to construct a second wharf commenced in April 2017 with services diverted to Jeffrey Street.

Services

Connections
Busways operates three routes to and from Milsons Point wharf:
209: to East Lindfield
286: to Denistone East 
287: to Ryde Bus Depot

Keolis Downer Northern Beaches operates four routes to and from Milsons Point wharf:
227: to Clifton Gardens
228: to Mosman Junction
229: to Beauty Point
230: to Mosman Bay wharf

Nearby Milsons Point railway station is served by Sydney Trains North Shore & Western Line and Northern Line services.

References

External links

 Milsons Point Wharf at Transport for New South Wales (Archived 12 June 2019)
Milsons Point Local Area Map Transport for NSW
 Flickr gallery by Transport for New South Wales' Center for Maritime Safety

Ferry wharves in Sydney
Milsons Point, New South Wales